Pentodon is the scientific name of two genera of organisms and may refer to:

Pentodon (beetle), a genus of beetles in the family Scarabaeidae
Pentodon (plant), a genus of plants in the family Rubiaceae